Ahuna Mons is the largest mountain on the dwarf planet and asteroid Ceres. It protrudes above the cratered terrain, is not an impact feature, and is the only mountain of its kind on Ceres. Bright streaks run top to bottom on its slopes; these streaks are thought to be salt, similar to the better known Cererian bright spots, and likely resulted from cryovolcanic activity from Ceres's interior. It is named after the traditional post-harvest festival Ahuna of the Sümi Naga people of India. In July 2018, NASA released a comparison of physical features, including Ahuna Mons, found on Ceres with similar ones present on Earth.

Discovery

The mountain was discovered on images taken by the Dawn spacecraft in orbit around Ceres in 2015.

Origin
It has been proposed that Ahuna Mons formed as a cryovolcanic dome. It is the closest cryovolcano to the Sun yet discovered. It is roughly antipodal to the largest impact basin on Ceres,  diameter Kerwan. Seismic energy from the Kerwan-forming impact may have been focused on the opposite side of Ceres, fracturing the outer layers of the area and facilitating the movement of high viscosity cryovolcanic magma (consisting of muddy water ice softened by its content of salts) that was then extruded onto the surface. Crater counts suggest that formation of the mountain continued into the last several hundred million years, making this a relatively young geological feature.

This suggests it was formed by a plume of mud rising from the mantle.

See also 

 List of geological features on Ceres
 List of tallest mountains in the Solar System

Notes

References

External links
 New View Of Ceres Conical Mountain A Puzzler, Bog King

Extraterrestrial mountains
Extraterrestrial volcanoes
Surface features of Ceres
Articles containing video clips